Tsz Shan Monastery is a large Buddhist temple located in Tung Tsz, Tai Po District, Hong Kong. Within the monastery, there is a 76-meter tall statue of Rúyìlún Guānyīn (如意輪觀音), also known as Cintamanicakra, a manifestation of the Bodhisattva Guanyin. Nestled against the Pat Sin Leng (八仙嶺) mountain range overlooking Plover Cove Reservoir, the Monastery spans around 500,000 square feet. 

The Monastery completed its construction and opened to public visitors in April 2015. The idea for the development of Tsz Shan Monastery was germinated by Sir Li Ka-shing, Chairman of Li Ka Shing Foundation. The Foundation has contributed over HK$3.1 billion to cover the development costs and operating expenses to realise the essential Buddhist teachings of Clarity, Compassion and Action in service of the public. 

Tsz Shan Monastery appropriates the elementary energy of the mountains and waters and gathers the essence of the sun and the moon. Architectural features exist in harmony with the environment and blend with the natural landscape. The overall design is simple but elegant, creating a perfect setting for the depiction of the Dharma while embracing both traditional features and modern functions. 

Following the opening of Tsz Shan Monastery in 2015, there had been a rising sentiment in Mr. Li Ka-shing that Buddhist art can soothe the mind and nourish the soul with its visual aesthetics. With this conviction in mind, he set out to develop the Tsz Shan Monastery Buddhist Art Museum located underneath the giant Guanyin statue, and after years of planning and preparation, the Museum officially opened to the public in 2019.

Architectural Concept
Tsz Shan Monastery’s architectural style is inspired by the more solemn and elegant styles of the Tang, Northern Song, Liao and Jin dynasties, which existed over a period of about 600 years beginning in the 7th century.

The Monastery appropriates elements of nature in its planning as well. Tsz Shan Monastery is located on a hilly site with an expansive sea view to the front. The Monastery has two main precincts – the Main Buddha Hall Precinct and the Guan Yin Statue Precinct. Along with the Main Buddha Hall Precinct, the core consists of three main buildings placed along a central axis. Each building and associated courtyard is placed on platforms rising up the hill, well defined with surrounding corridors. Regarding the Guanyin Statue Precinct, another axis that branches off from the Grand Courtyard, devotees are led into the presence of the colossal Guanyin Statue, passing the Universal Gate.

Throughout its halls and its grounds, Tsz Shan Monastery provides many spaces for contemplation. Nature is present throughout dark African padauk wood, wavy white-grey granite, marble and bronze are the monastery's most important building materials. They are ones of texture and richness with a connection to origin.

Ruyilun Guanyin Statue 

A 76-meter tall statue of Rúyìlún Guānyīn (如意輪觀音), including a six-meter high bronze lotus platform on which the statue stands, is situated on the left side of the temple compound. On the crown of the statue is a small image of the Buddha Amitābha. The statue holds a water vase in her left hand and a cintamani gem (如意寶珠, Rúyìbǎozhū) in her right hand. The presence of the Kintamani gem classifies the statue as a two-armed variation of the Cintamanicakra manifestation of Guanyin.

Vision
The Monastery has four main branches to disseminate Buddhist teachings to the grand public: Care, Institute, Art and Youth. 
 Care is spread through the Buddhist Spiritual Counselling Centre (BSCC).
 Institute represents the educational activities and materials provided by the Tsz Shan Institute.
 Art is through the Tsz Shan Monastery Buddhist Art Museum’s Buddhist art Museum exhibits. 
 Youth is through the Tsz Shan Youth and experiential programmes.

Care 
- The Buddhist Spiritual Counselling Centre of Tsz Shan Monastery (TSMBSCC) is the first of its kind established in Hong Kong. The Centre is staffed with professional social workers and counsellors to provide Buddhist spiritual counselling services, assisting people in finding out the causes of their problems, help them alleviate their suffering and transforming their negative emotions into positive spiritual energy so that they can reorient their lives. 
Institute
- Tsz Shan Institute is a research and learning division of Tsz Shan Monastery. Bridging theory and practice, to provide systematic and comprehensive Dharma education to people of all ages, levels of education, cultures and professional backgrounds. The core mission is to transform minds and hearts with altruistic love, empower people to live with happiness, gratefulness, satisfaction and feel connected in life. 

Art 
- Tsz Shan Monastery Buddhist Art Museum houses precious Buddhist artefacts and objects from across the globe. Through unique exhibitions and cultural activities, the Museum seeks to interweave Buddhist art and culture, and present visitors with a platform for art appreciation and spiritual nourishment. Set within a circular enclosure, this denotes the freeing of the minds and accomplishing inner contentment – a state that the Museum hopes visitors experience during their circumambulations. The Tsz Shan Monastery Buddhist Art Museum is also the first and only museum in Hong Kong dedicated to Buddhist art and relics as its primary exhibits, curatorial themes and research fields.

Youth 
- Tsz Shan Youth provides a platform for young people to be exhilarated by the Dharma. Through different programmes such as experiential learning and summer camp, the Monastery is devoted to supporting young people to grow and develop with a positive attitude.

Spiritual Practices

According to traditional Buddhist teachings, tea meditation, water offering, Zen calligraphy and walking meditation are all important practices in everyday life, reminding us of the importance of persistence in taming one's mind. Even in the face of chaos and confusion, one has to retain awareness to take care of the deluded mind. Through these practices, Tsz Shan Monastery wishes that every visitor can re-establish the habit of taking care of the mind as a way to nurture positive energy, in order to respond to the needs of body and mind in a proactive way. Visitors are most welcome to join these activities when they visit the Monastery.

Transportation
For more information about transportation routes, refer to Visit Info on the Monastery Website.

References
 Tsz Shan Monastery, "Architectural Concept"
 Tsz Shan Monastery, "Counselling Centre"
 Tsz Shan Monastery, "Institute"
 Tsz Shan Monastery Buddhist Art Museum, "About Us"
 Tsz Shan Monastery, "Spiritual Practices"
 Tsz Shan Monastery, "Visit"

External links 

 Tsz Shan Monastery Official Website 
 Tsz Shan Monastery Buddhist Art Museum Official Website 
 Tsz Shan Monastery Buddhist Spiritual Counselling Centre

Buddhist monasteries in Hong Kong
Tai Po District
Colossal Guanyin statues
Buddhist temples in Hong Kong